The White House Historical Association, founded in 1961 through efforts of First Lady Jacqueline Kennedy, is a private, non-profit organization that works to preserve the history of the White House and make that history more accessible to the public. , the president of the association is Stewart McLaurin.

History

After moving into the White House in 1961, Jacqueline Kennedy founded the White House Historical Association, which was chartered on November 3 of that year. The goals of the association were to raise private funds for maintaining and renovating the White House and to create  an official White House guidebook.

In 1981, under First Lady Nancy Reagan, the association began its current practice of selling a unique White House Christmas ornament to the public each year. Beginning in 1982, each year's ornament honors a different president. Since 1981, the ornaments are primarily manufactured at [[Beacon Design by ChemArt] in Lincoln, Rhode Island. , hundreds of thousands of ornaments are sold each year. The White House Historical Association also produces the wooden eggs distributed during the annual White House Easter Egg Roll.

Financier and former White House staffer David M. Rubenstein donated $10 million to the association in 2011 to establish the David M. Rubenstein National Center for White House History, an educational institute under the White House Historical Association's purview. In 2016, the association created a Digital Library, currently hosted on Amazon Web Services (AWS). The partnership between the association and AWS expanded the following year. In 2018, the association shared a collection of roughly 25,000 photographs of White House history that it had organized and digitized for the first time. The association also created a monthly podcast, called 1600 Sessions, in 2017.

Scope

Maintenance and restoration
In its work, the White House Historical Association collaborates with the first family, the White House chief usher, and the curator of the White House. The association focuses on maintaining and interpreting the state rooms of the White House Executive Residence and the rest of the White House Complex. The association also works with the Committee for the Preservation of the White House to curate and purchase new decorations and art for the White House. This includes funding the creation of unique state china tableware for several presidential administrations and funding one portrait of each President and First Lady. The association also helps fund maintenance and restoration of some rooms of the White House.

Education
The association publishes the official White House guide. In the White House Visitor Center, the association operates a gift shop and book store. The association also creates and publishes media on the history, art, and architecture of the White House, and the quarterly journal White House History. , books published by the association had sold more than eight million copies. The association sponsors scholarship, seminars, and exhibitions on the history of the White House. , the association awarded three White House History Fellowships each year in collaboration with the Organization of American Historians. It operates the David M. Rubenstein National Center for White House History at Decatur House.

Funding
The majority of the funding for the White House Historical Association comes from private contributions, in addition to corporate contributions and the sale of publications and gift items. The association manages the White House Acquisition Trust and the White House Endowment Trust.

Leadership
The association’s current president, Stewart McLaurin, has served since 2014, focused on expanding its audiences, educational programming, development base and impact. He is the author of James Hoban: Designer and Builder of the White House.

Previous top executives have been Nash Castro, Daniel E. Davis, Hillory A. Tolson, Bernard R. Meyer and Neil W. Horstman.  The current board chair, John F. W. Rogers, has served since January 2022.  Previous board chairs were Fred Ryan, David E. Finley Jr., Dr. Melvin Payne, Robert L. Breeden, Hugh Sidey, and Henry A. Dudley Jr.

References

Bibliography

External links

Website of the White House Historical Association 
White House Historical Association decorative arts timeline

Historical Association, White House
Heritage organizations
Historic preservation organizations in the United States
Non-profit organizations based in Washington, D.C.
Organizations established in 1961
1961 establishments in Washington, D.C.
Jacqueline Kennedy Onassis